The flag of Utrecht has been in use since 1952. It consists of two horizontal stripes of equal width, the upper one white and the lower one red. Similar to the flag of Poland or an upside-down flag of Monaco. In the top left corner of the flag there is a red square with a white cross. The flag originates from two other flags, one part of the Archdiocese of Utrecht, and the other of the (territorial) Archbishopric of Utrecht. In 1951 the province was advised by the Hoge Raad van Adel to adopt a flag to represent the province.

1952 establishments in the Netherlands
Flags introduced in 1952
Flags of the Netherlands
Flags with crosses
Red and white flags
Flag